William Hanna Thomson (1833 –  January 18, 1918) was an American physician and Christian writer.

Biography

Thomson was born in Beirut. He was the son of missionary William McClure Thomson. He was educated in the United States and obtained his B.A. from Wabash College (1850), M.D. from Albany College (1859), M.A. from Yale University (1861) and LL. D. from New York University (1885).

Thomson was assistant physician at Quarantine Hospital in New York and physician to the Charity Hospital. He was a consulting physician to Roosevelt Hospital and Bellevue Hospital. He was Professor of Medicine at New York University Medical College. Thomson was a member of the New York Neurological Society. He was President of the New York Academy of Medicine during 1899–1900.

His book Life, Death and Immortality (1911), defended Christian immortality.

Selected publications

Materialism and Modern Physiology of the Nervous System (1892)
Brain and Personality (1906)
The Great Argument: Or Jesus Christ in the Old Testament (1884)
What is Physical Life?: Its Origins and Nature (1909)
Life, Death and Immortality (1911)
Life and Times of the Patriarchs (1912)
A Treatise on Clinical Medicine (1914)

References

Further reading

1833 births
1918 deaths
19th-century American physicians
20th-century American physicians
American Christian writers
New York University alumni
University at Albany, SUNY alumni
Wabash College alumni
Writers from Beirut
Yale University alumni